David C. Banks (born August 5, 1959) is an American attorney and educator who is currently serving as the 31st New York City Schools chancellor in the administration of Mayor Eric Adams.

Early life and education 
Banks's mother was a secretary and his father, Philip Banks Jr., retired as a lieutenant from the New York City Police Department. Banks grew up in Southeast Queens. He has two brothers, including Philip Banks III, who retired from the NYPD as chief of department on October 31, 2014. Banks earned a Bachelor of Arts degree from Rutgers University and a Juris Doctor from St. John's University.

Career 
Banks worked for the city’s law department and the state attorney general before becoming a public school teacher in Crown Heights. He also helped to create the Bronx School for Law, Government and Justice, a prototype for the small schools initiative. Banks served as president and CEO the Eagle Academy Foundation, a network of public all-boys' schools until his appointment as New York City Schools Chancellor.

Personal life 
Banks's partner, Sheena Wright, is the current First Deputy Mayor of New York City. She was the former Deputy Mayor For Strategic Policy Initiatives of New York City and former president and CEO of the United Way of New York City.

References

External links
 Biography from the Eagle Academy Foundation

Living people
New York City School Chancellors
Rutgers University alumni
African-American educators
1962 births